The Ambassador-at-Large for Global Women's Issues is the ambassador-at-large who heads the Office of Global Women's Issues in the United States Department of State. This ambassador-at-large also has the rank of Assistant Secretary.

The position was created by the Barack Obama administration in 2009. The first ambassador-at-large was Melanne Verveer, who served from April 6, 2009, until she was replaced by Catherine M. Russell on May 8, 2013. The post was vacant from January 20, 2017, until Ambassador Kelley Eckels Currie was confirmed by the Senate and took office on January 14, 2020. Currie left the post on January 20, 2021, and the position is vacant. The Senior Official performing the duties of the office is currently Katrina Fotovat.

The Department of State's Office of Global Women's Issues ensures that the rights of women and girls are fully integrated into the formulation and conduct of United States foreign policy. Working with the White House, USAID, the Department of Defense, and other agencies, as well as with civil society and the private sector, the United States Department of State has launched multiple and wide-ranging global initiatives to promote women's social and economic development, integrate women into peace and security building, address and prevent gender-based violence, and ensure women's full participation in civic and political life.

Accomplishments of the Office of Global Women's issues to date include health care and police training to help survivors of sexual violence in the Congo and support for female entrepreneurs in the Americas.

List of ambassadors

References

External links
 United States Office of Global Women's Issues
 Twitter account, U.S. State Dept | Office of Global Women's Issues (@GenderAtState)